Droga krajowa nr 91 (translates from Polish as national road 91) is a route belonging to Polish national roads network. It runs from the seaport in Gdańsk to Częstochowa, and goes through the Pomeranian, Kuyavian-Pomeranian, Łódź and Silesian Voivodeships. Since this route was renumbered from DK1, it is frequently referred as "stara jedynka" (eng. "old one").

National road 91 is the alternative road for A1 motorway (partially tolled). As such, it runs parallel to:
 existing stretch of motorway A1 from exit "Rusocin" to Piotrków Trybunalski,
 the dual carriageway road (part of national road 1) between Piotrków Trybunalski and Częstochowa built in 1970s, which is currently under reconstruction to the motorway standard.

Major cities through the route 
 Rusocin (connects with A1, S6 and national road 1)
 Tczew
 Świecie
 Toruń
 Łódź (national road 14, national road 72)
 Piotrków Trybunalski (expressway S8, national road 12, voivodeship road 716)
 Kamieńsk (voivodeship road 484)
 Radomsko (national road 42, voivodeship road 784)
 Częstochowa (national road 1, national road 46, voivodeship road 786)

Route plan

References

91